Iliess Macani (born 6 December 1993) is an English rugby league footballer who plays as a er for the London Broncos in the Betfred Championship.

He previously played for the London Broncos. Macani came through the London Broncos Scholarship and Academy teams and also played for the London Skolars juniors.

Background
Macani was born in Tottenham, London, England.

Playing career

London Broncos
Macani made his Super League début for the London Broncos on 9 August 2013 against St Helens scoring a try. He went on to make 1 more appearance that season against Hull Kingston Rovers.

On 4 July 2014, Iliess Macani signed a two-year contract extension with the London Broncos to keep him at the club until the end of the 2016 season.

The 2015 season was Macani's best season to date with the winger playing 28 games and scoring 12 tries. The 21 year old was rewarded by the head coach, Andrew Henderson with the number 5 shirt for the 2016 season.

London Skolars
Iliess Macani also featured for his junior club, the London Skolars in the Kingstone Press Championship 1 on dual registration from First:Utility Super League club, London Broncos playing 7 times and scoring 4 tries.

Bradford Bulls
Iliess Macani signed for the Bradford Bulls. On 3 January 2017, Bradford Bulls were placed into liquidation by administrators and the contracts of players and staff were terminated. However Macani re-signed with the new club.

Iliess featured in the pre-season friendlies against Huddersfield and Keighley. Macani went on to featured in 25 games at his time with the Bradford side and scored ten tries during the 2017 Season.

Sheffield Eagles
At the end of the season he signed a one-year deal with Sheffield Eagles. He was the third signing by the Sheffield outfit ahead of the 2018 season. He featured in the pre-season friendly against Bradford Bulls.

London Skolars
On 14 October 2019, he confirmed that he had committed to London Skolars for another year after the loan period ended

London Broncos (re-join)
On 15 October 2021, it was reported that he had rejoined London Broncos in the RFL Championship

References

External links

Sheffield Eagles profile
Bradford Bulls profile

1993 births
Living people
Bradford Bulls players
English people of Algerian descent
English rugby league players
London Broncos players
London Skolars players
People from Tottenham
Rugby league fullbacks
Rugby league centres
Rugby league players from London
Rugby league wingers
Sheffield Eagles players